A brood patch is a patch of featherless skin on the underside of birds during the nesting season. Feathers act as inherent insulators, and prevent efficient incubation. Birds have solved this evolutionary dilemma by developing dedicated brood patches. This patch of skin is well supplied with blood vessels at the surface, enabling heat transfer to the eggs when incubating. In most species, the feathers in the region shed automatically, but ducks and geese may pluck and use their feathers to line the nest. Feathers regrow sooner after hatching in precocial birds than for those that have altricial young.

Upon settling on a nest, birds will shift in a characteristic side to side manner to ensure full contact of the brood patch with eggs or young. 

The positions of brood patches can vary. Many have a single brood patch in the middle of the belly, while some shorebirds have one patch on each side of the belly. Gulls and Galliformes may have three brood patches. Pelicans, penguins, boobies, and gannets do not develop brood patches but cradle the eggs on their feet. Brood parasitic cuckoos do not develop brood patches. In species where both parents incubate, brood patches may develop in both sexes.

See also
 Broodiness

References

External links
 Brood patches
 Incubation energetics

Bird anatomy
Bird breeding